The 1933 Arizona State–Flagstaff Lumberjacks football team was an American football team that represented Arizona State Teachers College at Flagstaff (now known as Northern Arizona University) in the Border Conference during the 1933 college football season. In their first year under head coach Ira MacIntosh, the Lumberjacks compiled a 5–1 record and outscored opponents by a total of 59 to 38.

On October 14, 1933, the school dedicated Skidmore Field, its new turf-covered gridiron.

Schedule

References

Arizona State-Flagstaff
Northern Arizona Lumberjacks football seasons
Arizona State-Flagstaff Lumberjacks football